L'Union is a commune in the Haute-Garonne department in southwestern France.

It is a suburb of Toulouse, located just to the northeast of the city.

History
L'Union was founded in the 1790s after the fusion of Belbèze and Cornaudric. After leaving Spain, Napoleon's troops, under the command of Field Marshal and Marshal of the Empire Soult, battled there against troops under the command of the Duke of Wellington. The name Saint-Jean-de-l'Union is still spoken of, recalling the time when the communes of Saint-Jean et L'Union were unified.

Population

Education
L'Union has three nursery and primary schools (Belbèze-lès-Toulouse, Borde d'Olivier and Montizalguier), and one high school (collège Georges Chaumeton, named after the former mayor).

Sights
L'Union features an olive tree celebrating the new millennium, at the Town Hall. The Grand Hall of L'Union regularly welcomes artists. Its church features architecture of the nineteenth century.

Sport
L'Union has a sport club, established in 1957, called the ASU, with more than 5000 members and 300 organisers, and 26  different sports such as yoga, football, handball, rugby and tennis. The main park of L'Union is Parc de Malpagat, on the D888 road.

Sights

Transport
The D888 (Route d'Albi) road runs through the town in a south-west direction towards Toulouse and north-east to Albi, roughly 75 kilometres away. The A68 motorway (Toulouse-Albi) and the Périphérique bypass the south of L'Union, served by Junctions 1 and 14 respectively.

In a clockwise order, L'Union is bordered by Toulouse, Launaguet, Saint-Geniès-Bellevue, Saint-Jean, Montrabé and Balma.

See also
Communes of the Haute-Garonne department

References

Communes of Haute-Garonne